Gunnar S. Gundersen (25 December 1921 – 16 January 1983) or Gunnar S. (as he came to be known) was a Norwegian modernist painter.

Biography
Gunnar S. Gundersen was born in Førde, in the county of Sogn og Fjordane, Norway. Gundersen was among the young artists who attended the Oslo National Academy of the Arts in the years after Norway was liberated from Nazi-Germany. He was a pupil of Aage Storstein at the National Art Academy. He made his debut as early as 1947 at the Autumn Exhibition in Oslo.

His generation wanted to free themselves for the traditional Norwegian figurative painting and sought inspiration from leading artists in Europe at the time. Danish artist Richard Mortensen, as well as Auguste Herbin, Serge Poliakoff and Victor Vasarely. He belonged to a group of younger artists who were often referred to as Dødsgjengen together with fellow artists Ludvig Eikaas and  Odd Tandberg.

When he chose his modernist form he was quickly acknowledged as one of the leaders in the abstract art form in Norway. Gunnar S. is now regarded as one of the most significant painters of the Norwegian post-war period. Even though he never received the international acclaim he might have deserved, he became a unifying figure among his contemporaries in Norway. His work has been an inspiration for many artists in later generations.

This expression is at first glance a rendition of flat color fields. However, through extensive knowledge of theories of visual perception Gunnar S. is able to transform the color fields into images with a unique spatial quality, what Gunnar S. himself called "inconsistent space."

References

1921 births
1983 deaths
20th-century Norwegian painters
Norwegian male painters
People from Førde
20th-century Norwegian male artists